Bill Nelson (born 1942) is the administrator of NASA and former U.S. senator from Florida.

Bill Nelson may also refer to:

Arts and entertainment
 Bill Nelson (artist) (born 1946), illustrator and sculptor
 Bill Nelson (musician) (born 1948), English singer, guitarist and songwriter
 Bill Nelson (sound engineer) (20th century), American sound engineer
 Billy Nelson (actor) (1903–1973), American actor 
 Billy Bass Nelson (born 1951), American musician, member of the P-funk All Stars

Sports
 Bill Nelson (American football) (born 1948), American football defensive tackle
 Bill Nelson (baseball) (1863–1941), American baseball player
 Bill Nelson (sports coach), Australian swimming coach

Others
 Bill Nelson, murder victim who was killed, cooked and eaten by his wife Omaima Nelson
 Desiré Dubounet or Bill Nelson (born 1951), American alternative medicine promoter

See also
 William Nelson (disambiguation)
 Bill Nelsen (1941–2019), American football player